Cobalt silicide may refer to the following chemical compounds:

Dicobalt silicide, Co2Si
Cobalt monosilicide, CoSi
Cobalt disilicide, CoSi2